Touching Evil is an American crime drama television series, based on the British series of the same name created by Paul Abbott. It starred Jeffrey Donovan as Detective David Creegan and Vera Farmiga as Creegan's partner Detective Susan Branca. Brian Markinson, Kevin Durand and Zach Grenier co-starred. The premise of this adaptation was somewhat different from the UK series' storyline. Rather than acquiring the ability to sense criminals, Creegan's recovery from a gunshot wound to the head instead strips him of his impulse control and sense of shame.

The series was produced by actor Bruce Willis' production company Cheyenne Enterprises, and premiered on March 12, 2004. It ran for 13 episodes, ending on June 14, 2004. Although Touching Evil garnered acclaim from television critics, the USA Network deemed it commercially unsuccessful and opted not to renew the series for a second season.

Plot
Returning from a year-long psychological leave of absence after surviving an almost-fatal gunshot wound to the head, San Francisco Detective David Creegan (Jeffrey Donovan) is assigned to the FBI's Organized and Serial Crime Unit – a rapid-response, elite crime investigation squad – where he and his new partner, Detective Susan Branca (Vera Farmiga), find themselves committed to saving lives and solving cases. In spite of his inability to abide by common sense and the laws he is sworn to uphold, Creegan, with the help of Branca, works on hunting down the most vicious criminals on the streets.

Cast

Main
 Jeffrey Donovan as Detective David Creegan
 Vera Farmiga as Detective Susan Branca
 Kevin Durand as Special Agent Jay Swopes
 Zach Grenier as Special Agent Hank Enright
 Brian Markinson as Special Agent Charles Bernal

Recurring
 Larissa Tewson as Samantha Creegan
 Sydney Tewson as Lily Creegan
 Leila Johnson as Holly Creegan
 Bradley Cooper as OSC Agent Mark Rivers
 Pruitt Taylor Vince as Cyril Kemp
 Peter Wingfield as OSC Agent Jon Krakauer
 Christopher Redman as Ben Rivers
 D. Neil Mark as OSC Agent Garrett
 Veena Sood as OSC Agent Sattrah
 Devon Weigel as Emily Akins

Episodes

External links
 

2004 American television series debuts
2004 American television series endings
2000s American crime drama television series
American action television series
American television series based on British television series
English-language television shows
Television shows filmed in Vancouver
Television shows set in San Francisco
USA Network original programming